The 2002 World Junior AAA Championship was held in Sherbrooke, Quebec, Canada. Games were held at Amedée Roy Stadium in Sherbrooke and Julien Morin Stadium in Coaticook.

Final standings

See also

World Junior Baseball Championship

World Junior Baseball Championship
World Junior Baseball Championship
World Junior Baseball Championship
U-18 Baseball World Cup
Sport in Sherbrooke
2002
Baseball in Quebec
2002 in Quebec